Počedělice is a municipality and village in Louny District in the Ústí nad Labem Region of the Czech Republic. It has about 300 inhabitants.

Administrative parts
Villages of Orasice and Volenice are administrative parts of Počedělice.

References

Villages in Louny District